Espace 2 is the cultural radio station from the public company, RTS Radio Télévision Suisse and is broadcast in French-speaking Switzerland. Its slogan is "La vie côté culture" (The cultural side of life).

Programming consists mainly of classical music and jazz (JazzZ), but there are also magazine and discussion programmes on current (Les Temps qui courante) and historical topics (Histoire vivante), and produces literature programming (Entre les lignes).

The station was founded in 1956 with its headquarters in Lausanne, Switzerland.

It broadcasts on FM and DAB, but also via cable, satellite and online, where a live stream and podcasts are available. Two of the popular podcasts are Comme il vous plaira which talks about human science and history and L’humeur vagabonde which is about the lives of famous people.

Notes and references

External links 
 

1956 establishments in Switzerland
Radio stations established in 1956
French-language radio stations in Switzerland